After After Party is an American late-night talk show hosted by comedian Sonia Denis that premiered on August 13, 2018, on Facebook Watch. Episodes air on weekdays, five nights per week, at 9:00 PM EST and feature a panel of guests alongside sketches featuring Denis and the show's writing staff.

Premise
After After Party tackles "pop culture, politics and social issues alongside comedians, journalists and celebrity guests." Each episode blends "comedy, conversation, and context through a variety of creative formats, including: sketch & panel comedy with a rotating variety of personalities; wild card games & confessionals; surprise guest drop ins; and the “NTK” or “Need To Know,” the nightly last word of fun and serviceable advice."

Production
On August 8, 2018, it was announced that Facebook had given the production a series order for a first season consisting of thirty episodes. The series was created by Julie Miller and set to be hosted by comedian Sonia Denis. Miller was also slated to serve as an executive producer. Production companies involved with the series were expected to include Refinery29.

Each week's episodes are filmed twice a week on Mondays and Wednesdays, with shoots lasting between an hour to an hour and a half. Subjects chosen for discussion are meant to be topical but not too specific as episodes are not shot and released same day. Refinery29 generally sends material to Facebook for notes including a rundown of topics ahead of taping, scripts, and final edits.

Episodes

References

External links

English-language television shows
Facebook Watch original programming
2018 American television series debuts
2018 American television series endings
2010s American late-night television series